Anders Tamminen (17 July 1886 – 12 July 1971) was a Finnish gymnast. He competed in the men's artistic individual all-around event at the 1912 Summer Olympics.

References

1886 births
1971 deaths
Finnish male artistic gymnasts
Olympic gymnasts of Finland
Gymnasts at the 1912 Summer Olympics
Sportspeople from Vyborg
20th-century Finnish people